The Philippine coucal (Centropus viridis) is a species of cuckoo in the family Cuculidae.
It is endemic to the Philippines.

Distribution 
Medium, sexes similar; races differ in color carpenteri and mindorensis are all black while viridis and majer are black with chestnut wings, and in size carpenteri and majer are larger than viridis and mindorensis. in viridis Ad whole body and tail black, glossed with green; wings dark chestnut on inner secondaries becoming chestnut in outer secondaries and primaries, all tipped with dark brown; underwing coverts black glassed with green. imm head dark brown with faint light shaft streaks; tail black glossed with green with chestnut bars at tip; wings chestnut barred with dark brown; underparts blackish brown mottled or barred with buff. ad bill and legs black; eye blood red. imm bill, upper mandible black, lower mottled grey black; eye brown; legs grey.

Male: L 420 (16,1/2"); W 162; T 233; B 29; t 38.

female: L 444 (17,1/2"); W 171; T 259; B 36; t 42.

References

 A Guide to the birds of the philippines(2000) Robert S. Kennedy pedro C. Gonzales, Edward C, Dickinson Hector C. Miranda, jr. & Timothy H. Fisher

Philippine coucal
Endemic birds of the Philippines
Philippine coucal
Taxonomy articles created by Polbot